Carol Karp, born Carol Ruth Vander Velde (10 August 1926 in Forest Grove, Ottawa County, Michigan – 20 August 1972 in Maryland), was an American mathematician of Dutch ancestry, best known for her work on infinitary logic. She also played viola in an all-women orchestra.

Life
Born in Michigan to a farming supply store manager and a housewife, Carol and her siblings graduated from high school in Ohio. After that, she graduated from Manchester University, Indiana and went back to Michigan to study at Michigan State University (then called Michigan State College), where she earned a master's degree in 1950.

In 1951 she married Arthur Karp and took his last name. She continued her graduate study in mathematics while traveling to California and Japan with her husband, who worked in the US Navy. She completed her Ph.D. in 1959 at the University of Southern California under the supervision of Leon Henkin. Her dissertation, in formal language theory and infinitary logic, was Languages with Expressions of Infinite Length;
she later published it as a book with the same title (North–Holland Publishing, 1964).

Even before completing her doctorate, Karp had taken a faculty position in 1958 at the University of Maryland, College Park, where she was promoted to full professor after only seven years and became a "leader in the developing theory of infinitary logic". In 1969 she was diagnosed with breast cancer but remained active until her death three years later.

Legacy
The Karp Prize of the Association for Symbolic Logic is named in her honor.  The cash prize was established in 1973 and is awarded every five years for a "connected body of research, most of which has been completed in the time since the previous prize was awarded."

References

 

1926 births
1972 deaths
Manchester University (Indiana) alumni
Michigan State University alumni
University of Maryland, College Park faculty
American women mathematicians
20th-century American mathematicians
20th-century women mathematicians
20th-century American women